Kobyle  is a village in the administrative district of Gmina Nowy Wiśnicz, within Bochnia County, Lesser Poland Voivodeship, in southern Poland.

The village has a population of 1,250.

References

Kobyle